The International Confederation of Musicians (ICM) was a global union federation bringing together trade unions representing musicians.

The confederation was established on 11 May 1904, at a conference in Paris.  After World War I, it affiliated to the International Federation of Trade Unions.  By 1922, its affiliates had a total of 52,550 members, but it appears to have dissolved soon afterwards.  After World War II, a new International Federation of Musicians was established.

Affiliates
In 1922, the following unions were affiliated:

References

Trade unions established in 1904
Trade unions disestablished in the 1920s
Global union federations
Musicians' trade unions